is a district in the western part of the city of Nan'yō, Yamagata, Japan. As of 2003, it has an estimated population of 2,005.

Education
The town has an elementary school and junior high school, a shrine and several standing stone memorials. The junior high school was closed in 2008 and merged with Okigo Junior High School.

Transport
Ringō lies on National Route 113, and is served by Ringo Station on the Flower Nagai Line.

Nan'yō, Yamagata